Deng Xuemei (born 3 December 1991 in Ganzhou) is a Chinese Paralympic powerlifter. She won the gold medal in the women's +86 kg event at the 2020 Summer Paralympics held in Tokyo, Japan. She is also a two-time gold medalist in this event at the World Para Powerlifting Championships.

Results

References

External links
 

1991 births
Living people
Chinese powerlifters
Female powerlifters
Paralympic powerlifters of China
Paralympic gold medalists for China
Paralympic medalists in powerlifting
Powerlifters at the 2020 Summer Paralympics
Medalists at the 2020 Summer Paralympics
People from Ganzhou
21st-century Chinese women